"Every Day's a Saturday" is a single by Elemeno P released in 2002.
It has been used in both KFC and Coca-Cola New Zealand TV ads, as has the track "You Are" off their latest album Trouble in Paradise, being used on a Coca-Cola ad.

Track listing
"Every Day's a Saturday"
"Nirvana" (Big Band Mix)
"Some Other Summertime"

Elemeno P songs
2002 singles
2002 songs
Universal Music Group singles